The International Image Interoperability Framework (IIIF, spoken as 'triple-I-eff') defines several application programming interfaces that provide a standardised method of describing and delivering images over the web, as well as "presentation based metadata" (that is, structural metadata) about structured sequences of images.  If institutions holding artworks, books, newspapers, manuscripts, maps, scrolls, single sheet collections, and archival materials provide IIIF endpoints for their content, any IIIF-compliant viewer or application can consume and display both the images and their structural and presentation metadata.  

There are many digitisation programmes that have resulted in a particular collection’s content exposed on the web in a particular viewer application, but these various collections have not typically been interoperable with one another, and end users or institutions cannot substitute a viewer of their choice to consume the digitised material. The IIIF aims to cultivate shared technologies for both client and server to enable interoperability across repositories, and to foster a market in compatible servers and viewing applications.

Image API

One major use of an Image API endpoint for a given high resolution source image is to allow clients to request low resolution tiles for use in a Deep Zoom style viewing tool such as OpenSeadragon.

Presentation API

 
An institution would publish a Manifest (a JSON-LD document) that describes the structure of each book, artwork, manuscript or other artefact. The manifest contains references to Image API endpoints. A viewer application consuming the manifest can produce a coherent user experience for the artefact by implementing features such as page by page navigation, deep zooming into images and annotations on images.

Search API

The IIIF Search API allows for "searching annotation content within a single IIIF resource, such as a Manifest, Range or Collection."

Example use case
A use case for IIIF would be to allow a user to view a manuscript that has been dismembered in the past, with its leaves now scattered across various collections. If each collection exposes its digitized images via the Image API, then a scholar can construct and publish a manifest that digitally recombines the leaves to present a single coherent user experience for the manuscript in any compatible viewer.

History
The Image API was proposed in late 2011 as a collaboration between The British Library, Stanford University, the Bodleian Libraries (Oxford University), the Bibliothèque nationale de France, Nasjonalbiblioteket (National Library of Norway), Los Alamos National Laboratory Research Library, and Cornell University. Version 1.0 was published in 2012.

Version 1.0 of the Presentation API was published in 2013 and of the Search API in 2016.

Partial list of software that supports IIIF APIs

Image Servers
 Cantaloupe
 Hymir IIIF Server
 Loris IIIF Image Server
 IIPImage
 digilib
 Djatoka (with helper)

Viewers / client libraries
 OpenSeadragon
 Mirador
 Wellcome Player / British Library Universal Viewer
 IIIFViewer
 Leaflet-IIIF
 IIPMooViewer
 iNQUIRE
 CONTENTdm

See also
DjVu

References

External links
 Project homepage
 IIIF Showcase – software and websites that implement IIIF
 Project discussion forum (Google groups)
 IIIF for Museums – Introductory slide-deck, November 2014
 Awesome IIIF – big list of IIIF resources

Application programming interfaces
Digital library software
Electronic documents
Electronic publishing